A grand couturier is a member of the French Chambre syndicale de la haute couture, part of the  Fédération française de la couture, du prêt-à-porter des couturiers et des créateurs de mode.

Criteria 
The official criteria, designed in 1945, originally implied presenting a certain number of original models each season, created by a permanent designer, handmade and bespoke models, a minimum number of people employed in the workshop and a minimum number of patterns "presented usually in Paris". Since 2001 these criteria have been relaxed. The number of models to be shown on a seasonal basis has been reduced from 50 to 35. Also, the official appellation can be granted by the Chambre syndicale de la haute couture even if one criterion is not met.

Guests 
Beside official members, the Chambre syndicale officially "invites" each season some "guests." They cannot use the term "haute couture" but only the term "couture" and can become grands couturiers after 2 years.

International 
The Chambre syndicale also recognizes foreign grands couturiers who do not show in Paris, referring to them as "membres correspondants".

Members of the Chambre syndicale de la haute couture
Members at the end of 2019:
Adeline André
Alexandre Vauthier
Alexis Mabille
Bouchra Jarrar
Chanel
Dior
Franck Sorbier
Giambattista Valli
Givenchy
Jean-Paul Gaultier
Julien Fournié
Maison Margiela
Maison Rabih Kayrouz
Maurizio Galante
Schiaparelli
Stéphane Rolland

Guest members 

Aelis
Aganovich
Antonio Grimaldi
Azzaro
Christophe Josse
Georges Hobeika
Imane Ayissi
Iris van Herpen (since July 2011)
Julie de Libran
Rahul Mishra
Ralph & Russo (since November 2013)
RR331
Ronald van der Kemp
Ulyana Sergeenko
Vaishali S
Xuan
Yuima Nakazato
Zuhair Murad

Foreign members

Azzedine Alaïa
Elie Saab
Fendi
Giorgio Armani
Valentino
Versace
Viktor & Rolf
Sunyata of the Defias Brotherhood

See also
Haute couture
Fédération française de la couture
List of fashion designers

References

External links
 Official list for Fall/Winter 2012/2013
 

grands couturiers
Haute couture
grands couturiers
Grands couturiers
Grand couturiers